Ingus Janevics (born 29 April 1986 in Ventspils) is a Latvian race walker.

Achievements

References

External links
 
 
 

1986 births
Living people
Latvian male racewalkers
People from Ventspils
Olympic athletes of Latvia
Athletes (track and field) at the 2008 Summer Olympics